The Canadian province of Quebec became the first in Canada to introduce a carbon tax. The tax was to be imposed on energy producers starting October 1, 2007, with revenue collected used for energy-efficiency programs including public transit. The tax rate for gasoline in Canadian currency was 0.8 cents per litre, or about $3.50 per tonne of  equivalent. The tax was also applied at 0.9 cents per litre of diesel fuel; 0.96 cents per litre of light heating oil; 1 cent per litre of heavy heating oil; 1.3 cents per litre of coke used in making steel; 0.5 cents per litre of propane; and $8 per tonne of coal. The proceeds were paid into a Green Fund, which will provided the resources for the implementation of the provincial climate change plan. A complete list of measures and details can be found in the official plan (2006-2012): Quebec and Climate Change -- A Challenge for the Future.

Quebec's carbon taxes have increased since the 2007 plan was introduced.  As part of an effort to discourage car use, there is a public transportation tax of 3.0 cents per litre in the case of gasoline sold in Montréal and surrounding municipalities. These currency figures are in Canadian dollars. 

In Quebec, gasoline, diesel and propane taxes are reduced by varying amounts in certain remote areas and within 20 kilometres of the provincial and U.S. borders.

See also

 Western Climate Initiative

External links 

Government of Quebec:
  Carbon Pricing 
 Environment Quality Act
 Cap & Trade 
 Reporting

References 

Politics of Quebec
2008 introductions
Emissions reduction
Taxation in Canada
Environmental tax
Tax reform
Environment of Quebec